Adolphe-Louis-Émile Bitard (24 February 1826 – early 1888) was a 19th-century French journalist and scientific educator.

From age 17, he enlisted in the campaigns of Crimea and Italy. In addition to popular science books, he left a biographical dictionary and several practical encyclopedias.

Main publications 
1875: 
1878: ,Text online
1878: 
1878: 
1878: 
1878: . Reissue: , 1880.
1878: , Text online
1880: , Text online
1880: 
1880: 
1881: 
1884: 
1886: 
1891: .

Sources 
 Catherine Benedic, "Le Monde des vulgarisateurs", La science pour tous, sur la vulgarisation scientifique en France de 1850 à 1914, Paris, Bibliothèque du conservatoire national des arts et métiers, 1990, (p. 41).

External links 
 Adolphe Bitard on Data.bnf.fr

19th-century French journalists
French male journalists
Science journalists
1826 births
1888 deaths
19th-century French male writers